John Kissig Cowen (October 28, 1844 – April 26, 1904) was a U.S. Representative from Maryland and a railroad executive.

Born near Millersburg, Ohio, Cowen attended the public schools and the local academies at Fredericksburg and Hayesville, Ohio.  He graduated from Princeton College in 1866 and from the law department of the University of Michigan at Ann Arbor.  He was admitted to the bar of Ohio in 1868 and commenced practice in Mansfield, Ohio, including service as prosecuting attorney of Holmes County.

Cowen moved to Baltimore, Maryland, in February 1872 and was appointed counsel of the Baltimore and Ohio Railroad (B&O). From 1876 to 1896 he served as the general counsel. He was elected as a Democrat to the Fifty-fourth Congress, serving from March 4, 1895 to March 3, 1897, but was not a candidate for renomination in 1896 to the Fifty-fifth Congress.

In January 1896, Cowen was chosen to be president of the B&O Railroad, a position he served in until June 1901. He died in Chicago, Illinois, and was interred in Oak Hill Cemetery in his home town of Millersburg.

See also
List of railroad executives

References

1844 births
1904 deaths
Baltimore and Ohio Railroad people
American railroad executives
Ohio lawyers
Maryland lawyers
People from Millersburg, Ohio
Princeton University alumni
University of Michigan Law School alumni
Democratic Party members of the United States House of Representatives from Maryland
19th-century American politicians
19th-century American businesspeople